Helena Moreno (born 2 January 2001) is a Costa Rican swimmer. She competed in the women's 200 metre freestyle event at the 2017 World Aquatics Championships.

References

2001 births
Living people
Costa Rican female swimmers
Place of birth missing (living people)
Costa Rican female freestyle swimmers
21st-century Costa Rican women